Bellevue State Park can refer to either of two state parks in the United States:

Bellevue State Park (Delaware)
Bellevue State Park (Iowa)